Kompozitor Glinka (English literal translation, Composer Glinka; American release title Man of Music) is a 1952 Soviet biographical film directed by Grigori Aleksandrov.

Plot 
The young composer Mikhail Glinka performs his new work at a soiree at Count Vielgorsky's house. However, the public is accustomed to Western music, and reacts coldly to the creation of the composer. The disappointed Glinka decides to go learn the art of music in Italy.

After returning from Italy, he is full of desire to write a Russian opera. Vasily Zhukovsky proposes a subject: a exploit of Ivan Susanin. Tsar Nicholas I changes the name of the opera to A Life for the Tsar and assigns a librettist - Baron Georg von Rosen.  When Glinka meets him, he is shocked: Rosen speaks Russian with a noticeable German accent. The premiere is successful, but Glinka is still not entirely happy with the libretto: "Rosen wrote the wrong words".

When the tsar learns that Glinka's opera Ruslan and Lyudmila is based on a subject by Pushkin, he sees it as sedition. This is a bitter experience for Glinka, but he is comforted by the support of "the progressive Russian people."

Cast 
 Boris Smirnov as Mikhail Glinka
 Lev Durasov as Alexander Pushkin
 Lyubov Orlova as Lyudmila Glinka
 Yury Lyubimov as Alexander Dargomyzhsky
 Georgy Vitsin as Nikolai Gogol
 Konstantin Nassonov as Vasily Zhukovsky
 Igor Litovkin as Alexander Griboyedov
 Andrei Popov as Vladimir Stasov
 Yuri Yurovsky as prince Mikhail Vielgorsky
 Sergei Vecheslov as Vladimir Odoevsky
 Svyatoslav Richter as Franz Liszt
 Bella Vinogradova as Giuditta Pasta
 Alexander Sashin-Nikolsky as Dmitry Petrov
 Mikhail Nazvanov as Nicholas I of Russia
 Irina Likso as Empress Alexandra Feodorovna
 Pavel Pavlenko as Thaddeus Bulgarin
 Vladimir Saveliev as Karl Ivanovich
 Faina Shevchenko as wife of Karl Ivanovich
 Rina Zelyonaya as general's wife
 Radner Muratov as bellhop in the theater
 Gennady Yudin as Hector Berlioz
 Anatoly Papanov as adjutant of the Grand Duke
 Sergei Kurilov as Karl Bryullov
 Elena Izmailova as Olga Lanskaya, Odoevsky's wife (no credits)

Awards
1953 Locarno International Film Festival
Won: Golden Leopard

References

External links

Films directed by Grigori Aleksandrov
Golden Leopard winners
Soviet biographical films
1950s biographical films
Films about classical music and musicians
Films about composers
Films set in the 19th century
Mosfilm films
1950s historical films
Soviet historical films
Cultural depictions of Nicholas I of Russia
Cultural depictions of Alexander Pushkin
Cultural depictions of Franz Liszt
Films about censorship
Films about the Russian Empire